Lu Guang is the name of:

 Lü Guang (337–400), 3rd-century Chinese emperor
 Lu Guang (painter), Yuan dynasty (1271–1368) Chinese landscape painter and poet
 Lu Guang (photographer) (born 1961), Chinese photographer